Fred Spiksley (25 January 1870 – 28 July 1948) was an English footballer and coach, who played as a forward for Sheffield Wednesday and England. He also played for Gainsborough Trinity, Glossop North End, Leeds City, Watford. After retiring as a player in 1906, he worked as a coach and won national league titles in Sweden, Mexico and Germany. During the First World War he was arrested but escaped from a German Police prison.

Early and personal life
Spiksley was born in Gainsborough, the son of a boilermaker. He was married to Ellen with a son, Fred Jr. He and Ellen later divorced due to his adultery. Spiksley was also a gambler who suffered heavy losses and was made bankrupt in 1909.

Playing career

After playing for local teams in Gainsborough, including Gainsborough Trinity (for whom he had scored 131 goals in 126 appearances), he signed for Wednesday in 1891. His later career was marred by injury (including a serious knee injury in 1903) and he played for Leeds City, Southern United and Watford.

He was also an England international.

Coaching career
After retiring as a player Spiskley joined the circus, and worked in a theatre with Charlie Chaplin. He then became a football coach who worked in Sweden, Germany, France, Switzerland, Belgium, Spain, the United States, Peru and Mexico, as well as in England.

After World War I broke out, he was coaching in Germany and was held in Ruhleben internment camp along with his son. His wife managed to secure their release, and the family moved to Switzerland. He then returned to England but was deemed unfit to serve in the War due to his earlier knee injury, which Spiksley exacerbated by dislocating his knee at will to fool the medical examiner. He spent the war working in Sheffield as a munitions inspector, resuming his coaching career after the war ended.

He ended his career coaching at the King Edward VII School in Sheffield.

Playing style
Spiksley was a "slight and silky winger" who was described as the "fastest man in football" by his England international team-mate Billy Bassett.

Later life and death
Spiksley and his wife divorced due to his adultery. He died from a heart attack at the age of 78 whilst attending Ladies' Day at Goodwood Racecourse in 1948.

References

External links

Profile on englandfootballonline

1870 births
1948 deaths
AIK Fotboll managers
English footballers
England international footballers
English football managers
Gainsborough Trinity F.C. players
Sheffield Wednesday F.C. players
Glossop North End A.F.C. players
Leeds City F.C. players
Watford F.C. players
Fulham F.C. non-playing staff
People from Gainsborough, Lincolnshire
TSV 1860 Munich managers
1. FC Nürnberg managers
FC Lausanne-Sport managers
World War I civilian detainees held by Germany
English expatriate football managers
English Football League representative players
English Football League players
Association football midfielders
Escapees from German detention
FA Cup Final players